Christy Uduak Essien-Igbokwe,  MFR (11 November 1960 – 30 June 2011) was a Nigerian musician and actress. Called "Nigeria's Lady of Songs", she was known for her songs "Seun Rere" Tete Nula, Ife, Hear the Call and Give me a Chance. She was the first female president of the Performing Musicians Association of Nigeria (PMAN), and the chairwoman and managing director of Soul Train Entertainment.

She sang in Igbo, Ibibio, Efik, Hausa, Yoruba and English. Her fluency in Igbo, Hausa, Yoruba, English, and her native Ibibio gave her an appeal which crossed tribal lines.

Early life
Christy was born in Okat, Onna, Akwa Ibom State. Her mother died when she was 12; she then lived in Aba, Abia with a friend of her mother, who encouraged her singing career and bought her a second-hand cassette player to record her songs.

Career
Christy began her musical career in secondary school, singing at clubs such as Unikoko in Aba. She appeared as a regular on the NTA Aba variety shows Now Sound and Ukaonu's Club, and in 1976 she joined the cast of The New Masquerade as Akpenor, the wife of the cantankerous character Jegede Sokoya (Claude Eke). Her role on the popular show caught the public eye, and she released her debut album (Freedom) the following year. Essien's albums sold well, and most successful was 1981's Ever Liked My Person (produced by Lemmy Jackson).

At the forefront of issues affecting women and children, she empowered thousands of women, she appeared in early Nollywood films such as Flesh and Blood (co-starring with Richard Mofe-Damijo, Ameze Imarhiagbe, and Ekpeyong Bassey Inyang and Directed by Chico Ejiro) and Scars of Womanhood (co-starring Kate Henshaw, Sam Loco Efe, Justus Esiri, Francis Duru) both of which addressed child abuse and female circumcision. Desiring to improve life for Nigerian artists, Essien is credited with initiating the first meeting which formed the Performing Musicians Association of Nigeria (PMAN) in 1981. The association was founded a year later; King Sunny Adé was president, Sonny Okosun was vice-president, and Essien was treasurer. From 1996 to 1999, she was the PMAN's first female president. Essien appeared in many national and international shows and composed and performed Akwa Ibom State's informal anthem, "Akwa Ibom Mmi (My Akwa Ibom)", in 1987. Christy Essien Igbokwe released 10 Albums between the 1977 and 1992, with an 11th on the horizon before her demise, which was later released in 2013. She was active globally with her music and acting throughout her career. In her later years, She performed with her second son, Chinwuba Kenechukwu Kaka, at the January 2009 Inspire Africa benefit concert and participated in the MTN Musical Festival later that year. Chinwuba Kenechukwu Kaka is a hip-hop artist and producer and the father of her granddaughter Christiana Chizaramekpeleamaka Ijeoma. Essien-Igbokwe's album, Ever Liked My Person, which had the monster hit Seun Rere was certified platinum in Nigeria. A Biography titled Uduak "The will of God" was produced and sponsored by Exxon Mobil in the 90s to show her life and career so far at the time. Her granddaughter remixes hit song 'Seun Rere.

Death
Essien-Igbokwe died after a brief illness on 30 June 2011 at age 50 at Ikeja General Hospital. Then Lagos State Governor Babatunde Fashola, Onyeka Owenu, Bisi Olatilo (Veteran Broadcaster), Soni Irabor, Oritz Wiliki, Remi Tinubu, Goodluck Ebele Jonathan, Aliko Dangote and Victor Uwaifo amongst others paid tribute to the singer. To celebrate the remembrance of the late music icon on 30 June 2020, the granddaughter of Christy Essien Igbokwe "Christiana Chizaramekpeleamaka Ijeoma" covered “You’re Welcome” from Disney's “Moana“.

Awards and honours 
INTERNATIONAL AWARDS

 "Silver Prize" Winner at 6th Seoul Songs Festival, South Korea – 1983
 "Grand Prix “ Winner at Neewollah Music Festival at Independence, Kansas, USA – 1983
 "International Special Achievement" Award of MUSEXPO, Acapulco, Mexico, 1983
 "Certificate of Merit" Award for Song writing and composing at the 10th Annual American
 Songs Festival, Los Angeles, USA – 1983
 "Audience Favourite" Award of International Music Festival at Baker University, USA –1983
 "Silver Prize" Winner at Second International Music Festival of Oklahoma University, USA –1983
 "Outstanding Performance" Award at the World Song Festival, L.A. Arts Academy, USA –1984
 "Distant Accord" Award at the FIDOF Festival in Hollywood, L.A., USA, 1990
 Honorary Doctorate Degree (Honoris Causa) Award in Business Management by
 Cornerstone University & Theological Seminary, Jerusalem, Israel – 2010
 Honorary Doctorate Degree (Honoris Causa) Award in Literature-in-Africa the by University of
 Berkley, Chicago, Illinois, USA – 2010

NATIONAL AWARDS

 "Lady of Songs" by Nigerian Entertainment Writers – 1980
 "Star Performer" Award of Nigerian Television Authority (NTA) – 1983
 "Best Actress Runner-Up" Award for Excellence by silver Jubilee Committee of the Nigerian Television Organization of Nigeria (NTA) – 1984
 "African Music Mother" Award by Music Extravaganza’84 in collaboration with African Music Development, New York, USA
 "Adaha Onna" (Pillar of Onna LGA)
 Akwa Ikwo Eket (The Greatest Singer from Eket Community) by Eket LGA Authority
 Aha Nwanyi Ejiagamba 1 of Oru Ahiazu, Mbaise, Imo State
 "Golden Voice of Africa" Award by music Students Association, Obafemi Awolowo University, Ile-Ife
 "Gold Award" of 25 Nigerian Celebrities – 1988
 "Certificate of Honour" by the Nigerian Union of Journalists, Anambra State Council – 1990
 "Certificate of Recognition" by National Film Festival – 1992
 "Service to the Music Profession" Award by PMAN the on platform of NIGERIAN MUSIC AWARD (to Christy Essien Igbokwe/Edwin Igbokwe) for their efforts in forming and creating PMAN – 1988
 Special Musical Patents Decoration Award – 1994
 "Merit Award for Excellence in the Field of Music Therapy" by Medical Association of Nigeria
 "Award of Honour" by Nigeria Institute of Journalism Student's Union, Ibadan Campus
 "Certificate of Honour" in recognition of her role as a woman of substance and her excellent performance in musical entertainment by the National Association of Akwa Ibom Students, University of Ibadan chapter.
 "Grand Fellow of Nigerian Youths" by the Nigerian Youth Organization
 "Queen of Music International" Award by the Association of Nigerian Theatre Arts Practitioners, Lagos State, and Degbola International Promotions – 1996
 "Outstanding Achievements Uplifting Female" Award by Youth Re-Orientation Movement – 1996
 "Merit Award in Honour of Care for the Nigerian Child" by Broadway International School – 2000
 "Award of Excellence and Outstanding Leadership Qualities" as PMAN first Female President -1998
 "The Best Dressed Female Musician" Award in the Patriotic Dress category at the Nigeria Fashion Show – 1997
 "Member of the Greatest Performers" Award in recognition of her immense contribution to the development and reformation of the world youths – 1996
 "Award of Excellence" as Matron of the Great Eni-Njoku Hall (University of Lagos chapter – 2000
 "Pacesetter Award" in recognition of her vision, initiator and organizer of the First ECOWAS Cultural and Musical Festival & the Entertainment Award – 1997
 "Lover of Children" Award in recognition of her contribution towards child social and welfare development in society – by legendary Page Boys Club (Socio-Cultural & Humanitarian Club)
 "Member of the Order of the Federal Republic (MFR) by Federal Government of Nigeria – 1999
 "Defender of Children" Award by Interclassic Youth Forum (a non-governmental organization)
 "Outstanding Achievement in Entertainment Industry" Award by Top Celebrities Magazine – 2010
 "Merit Award for African Heritage” by The Gong African News Magazine – 2010
 "Honorary Fellowship Award" by Institute of Corporate & Business Affairs Management, Nigeria.
 "Nigerian Woman of Valor" Award by National Centre for Women Development, Abuja – 2010.

MATRONSHIP/EXTRA-CURRICULA POSITIONS

 Matron; Eni-Njoku Hall, University of Lagos
 Matron; Akwa Ibom Journalists Forum, Kaduna
 Matron; National Association of Akwa Ibom Students, University of Port Harcourt
 Matron; Nigerian Youth Tourist Organization
 Matron; National Association of Akwa Ibom Students, University of Lagos
 Matron; Association of Beauty Therapy & Cosmetology of Nigeria, Lagos
 Matron; Worldwide Twins and Multiple Foundation
 Deputy Vice President/Vice Chairman, Governing Council of Institute of Corporate and Business Affairs Management, Nigeria.

POSTHUMOUS AWARDS

 Entertainment Icon" by West African Women in Leadership Conference (in Ghana) – 2011
 "Excellence in Outstanding Performance & Hard Work" by National Association of Akwa Ibom State Students (NAAKISS) – University of Lagos Chapter – 2011 
 NOPA 2012 for outstanding contribution to the entertainment industry
 Essien-Igbokwe was known as "Lady of Songs". On 11 November 2018, what would have been her 58th birthday, Google commemorated her life with a doodle.
 "Award of Excellence" by Ibom Talent Development Center 11 June 2021

Albums 
 Freedom (1977)
 Patience (1978)
 Time Waits For No One (1978)
 One Understanding (1979)
 Give Me A Chance (1980)
 Ever Liked My Person? (1981)
 It's Time (1982)
 Taking My Time (1986)
 Hear The Call (1990)
 Mysteries of Life (1992)
 All of a Sudden (2013)

References

External links 
Seun Rere on OldNaija.com
Christy Essien on Discogs

1960 births
2011 deaths
Entertainers from Akwa Ibom State
Nigerian women singer-songwriters
Nigerian rhythm and blues musicians
20th-century Nigerian women singers
English-language singers from Nigeria
Yoruba-language singers
20th-century Nigerian actresses
Igbo-language singers
Nigerian film actresses
Ibibio people
21st-century Nigerian actresses
People from Akwa Ibom State
Nigerian women musicians
Nigerian singer-songwriters
Nigerian highlife musicians
Nigerian hip hop musicians
Nigerian soul musicians
21st-century Nigerian women musicians
Members of the Order of the Federal Republic